Domaine Huet is a wine estate located in Vouvray, France, in the region of the Loire Valley. Founded in 1928 by Victor Huet and his son Gaston Huet, it is known for producing exceptional wines from chenin blanc.

Viticulture 
Domaine Huet has 35 hectares of biodynamically farmed vineyards in the Vouvray appellation, composed of the following parcels:

 Le Haut-Lieu, 9 hectares
 Le Clos du Bourg, 6 hectares (acquired 1953) 
 Le Mont, 9 hectares (acquired 1957)

Winemaking 
Domaine Huet produces wines in a range of styles,  including pétillant, sec, demi-sec, and moelleux. Domaine Huet is considered the most celebrated wine producer from the Loire Valley, and is the only to have headlined a Christie's auction.

Recent history 
Upon the death of Gaston Huet in 2002, the company was partially sold to cover the French death tax. Anthony Hwang, an American millionaire who also owns Hungary's Domaine Királyudvar, purchased part of the domaine in 2003. Noël Pinguet, son-in-law of Gaston Huet, stayed on as winemaker until February, 2012.

Wine criticism 
In 2005 Decanter Magazine created a list  of their  100 Greatest Wines ever made. A 1947 S.A. Huet was ranked #6 on this listing—the second-highest ranking for any white wine behind only the 1921 vintage of Chateau d'Yquem.

References

Wineries of France